Dooher is a surname. Notable people with the surname include:

Brian Dooher (born 1975), Irish Gaelic footballer
John Anthony Dooher (born 1943), American Roman Catholic bishop
Tom Dooher (born 1963), American teacher and trade unionist

See also
Dooler